CAIC may refer to:
Cash Accumulation Insurance Contacts, typically universal life insurance used in restrictive employee benefit agreements {REBA} as patented by Geneva Media Holding, LLC.
Colorado Avalanche Information Center
Aviation Industry Corporation of China
Child abuse image content list (or CAIC list) from the Internet Watch Foundation